Epiphile adrasta, the common banner, is a species of tropical brushfoot in the butterfly family Nymphalidae. It is found in North America.

The MONA or Hodges number for Epiphile adrasta is 4544.7.

Subspecies
These three subspecies belong to the species Epiphile adrasta:
 Epiphile adrasta adrasta Hewitson, 1861
 Epiphile adrasta bandusia Fruhstorfer, 1912
 Epiphile adrasta escalantei Descimon & De Maeght, 1979

References

Further reading

External links

 

Biblidinae
Articles created by Qbugbot